Focus Financial Partners, LLC is an investor in independent, fiduciary wealth management firms, incorporated in 2004 by Ruediger (Rudy) Adolf, Rajini Kodialam and Leonard (Lenny) Chang.

As of 2018, Focus has offices in both New York and San Francisco, and approximately 60 partner firms across the United States, Australia, Canada and the United Kingdom. The partnership comprises over 2,700 wealth-management-focused principals and employees. Focus Financial Partners is listed on NASDAQ under the ticker symbol FOCS.

Focus issued an IPO in July 2018. The Wall Street Journal stated that the Focus IPO was the “first opportunity for stock investors to get in on the booming market for independent financial advice.” It was also described as “a bellwether that could open the door to liquidity for RIAs,” by Barron's and “a watershed moment for the RIA space,” by WealthManagement.

According to news reports, Focus has been one of the leaders in the shift of financial advisors from wire house broker dealers to registered investment advisers (RIAs). For the year ended December 31, 2017, Focus revenue exceeded $660 million, over 90% of which was fee-based and recurring in nature. Focus has been named six times to Inc. magazine's list of the 5000 fastest-growing private companies in America (most recently in 2017).

In April 2017, Focus announced that an investor group led by Stone Point Capital and KKR & Co. L.P. had acquired a majority stake in the company, valuing Focus at approximately $2 billion; the deal closed in July 2017.

In February 2023, Focus agreed to be taken private again by Clayton, Dubilier & Rice in an all-cash deal for a total enterprise value of over $7billion.

Business model
Focus invests in Registered Investment Advisers (RIAs) and helps large investment-management teams leaving brokerage houses to start their own independent firms within the Focus partnership (through the Focus Independence program).

The Wall Street Journal notes that Focus partner firms maintain their entrepreneurial independence while they benefit from the synergies, scale, economics and best practices of a market leader to help them achieve their business objectives. As Rudy Adolf describes the process, "First and foremost, the selling RIA retains operating autonomy through the management company, because we believe in never turning a successful entrepreneur into an employee."

Key personnel
Ruediger (Rudy) Adolf, Founder and Chief Executive Officer

Rudy Adolf incorporated Focus in 2004. He was previously Senior Vice President and General Manager of the Global Brokerage and Banking division of American Express. Before that, he was a partner at McKinsey & Company in New York, primarily focusing on financial services firms. He began his career with McKinsey in Munich.

Adolf has been featured on several lists of the most influential people of his industry.

In 2006, Wealth Management magazine named him one of its annual "Ten to Watch."

In 2017, Adolf was named to the list of Icons & Innovators by InvestmentNews, honoring visionaries who have shaped and transformed the financial advice profession.

Rajini Kodialam, Co-Founder and Managing Director

Rajini Kodialam was a vice president at American Express in New York, where she managed the overall online experience for the U.S. Consumer Card and Travel businesses. Kodialam was previously at McKinsey & Company in New York, specializing in consumer financial services firms.

Leonard (Lenny) Chang, Co-Founder and Managing Director

Prior to Focus, Lenny Chang was with the Boston Consulting Group, where he worked on a range of assignments for institutional asset management and financial brokerage firms. He previously worked at American Express in the Strategy and Business Development Group.

History
Adolf said of the company's founding that "We saw tens of thousands of independent firms out there, without good succession planning and handicapped by their small size. They were doing well, but could do better if they had some of the benefits of a big organization behind them without compromising their entrepreneurial independence and spirit."

By October 2007, the company had expanded to a total of 14 partner firms.  Focus began expanding internationally in 2008 with the addition of England's Greystone Financial Services Ltd., and later that year introduced its Focus Independence program to "help elite advisors fully realize their entrepreneurial potential".

In 2009, Polaris Venture Partners and Summit Partners provided Focus with $50 million of new capital.  Continuing to grow, Focus closed a $220 million credit facility in January 2012, making its access to credit "unique in the RIA industry."

In 2013, the company received an additional $216 million strategic equity investment from Centerbridge and in 2014 expanded to a $550 million credit facility. In 2015, Focus expanded into Canada through Dorchester Wealth Management and announced a $1 billion credit facility.

In 2017, the firm expanded internationally once more with an equity investment in Financial Professionals in Australia, and the total number of Focus partner firms passed 40.

In April 2017, Focus announced that an investor group, led by Stone Point Capital and KKR & Co. L.P. would acquire a majority stake in the company, valuing Focus at approximately $2 billion.

In May 2017, Focus announced that SCS Financial and its subsidiary, SCS Capital Management, an independent registered investment advisory firm based in Boston, Massachusetts and New York, New York, entered into a definitive agreement to join the Focus partnership, the largest deal in Focus' history.

In July 2018, the company offered over 16 million shares of the firm's Class A common stock. The IPO gathered a total of $615.4 million in gross proceeds. The stock jumped 14% on its first day of trading on the NASDAQ Stock Market.

In December 2020, RIA Intel reported that Focus planned to create its own RIA firm called Connectus Wealth Advisers.

References

External links

Financial services companies established in 2004
Financial services companies of the United States
Companies listed on the Nasdaq
2018 initial public offerings
Announced mergers and acquisitions